The Japan national cricket team is the men's team that represents the country of Japan in international cricket. The team is organised by the Japan Cricket Association (JCA), which has been a member of the International Cricket Council (ICC) since 1989. Japan made its international debut at the 1996 ACC Trophy in Malaysia. Most of the team's matches are played in regional competitions, generally against other teams in the ICC East Asia-Pacific development region. Between 2008 and 2012, Japan participated in the World Cricket League (WCL), reaching WCL Division Five at one point.

In April 2018, the ICC decided to grant full Twenty20 International (T20I) status to all its members. Therefore, all Twenty20 matches played between Japan and other ICC members since 1 January 2019 have been a full T20I.

History

Cricket was introduced to Japan in the 1860s, by the British, but did not become organised until the 1980s, when the Japan Cricket Association was formed. They became an affiliate member of the ICC in 1989, and the national team first played in the 1996 ACC Trophy, losing all their games including a 380 run defeat by Fiji. They continued without success in the 1998 tournament and the 2000 tournament.

After the 2000 ACC Trophy, they left the Asian Cricket Council and became part of the ICC's East Asia/Pacific region. They played in the East Asia Eights tournament in Australia in February 2002, finishing as runners-up to an Australian indigenous team. Indonesia and South Korea were the other teams in the tournament. In 2004, they hosted the East Asia Pacific Cricket Challenge tournament as part of qualification for the 2007 World Cup, finishing third after beating Indonesia in a play-off.

In June 2005, Japan were promoted to associate membership of the ICC and that year they played in the 2005 ICC EAP Cricket Cup in Vanuatu, winning the tournament after beating the Cook Islands in the final. The following year they played in the 2006 ICC EAP Cricket Trophy in Brisbane finishing last in the three team tournament that also involved Fiji and the Cook Islands.

In December 2007 Japan took part in the 2007 ICC EAP Cricket Trophy in Auckland, New Zealand, playing against the Cook Islands, Indonesia, Samoa, Tonga and Vanuatu. Japan won the tournament and qualified for Division Five of the World Cricket League where they finished in tenth place out of the twelve countries represented in Jersey.

On March 22, 2016, it was announced that Sano, Tochigi, would be home to the Sano International Cricket Ground, which will become Japan's first dedicated cricketing venue built for purpose which no longer has to compete with other sports for usage.

On October 9, 2022, Japan played their first ever T20 international match against Indonesia. In January 2023 it was announced that Japan and Indonesia would be included in Asian Cricket Council (ACC) pathway events, while remaining in the ICC East Asia-Pacific development region.

Tournament history

ACC Trophy
1996: First round
1998: First round
2000: First round

World Cricket League
2008: Division 5 Tenth place
2009: Division 7 Fourth place
2011: Division 7 Sixth place
2012: Division 8 Third place

East Asia Cup
2015: 2nd place
2016: 2nd place
2018: Won

Records

International Match Summary — Japan
 
Last updated 18 October 2022

Twenty20 International 

T20I record versus other nations

Records complete to T20I #1829. Last updated 18 October 2022.

Other matches
For a list of selected international matches played by Japan, see Cricket Archive.

See also
Japan national women's cricket team
Japan Cricket Association
Cricket in Japan
List of Japan Twenty20 International cricketers
Sano International Cricket Ground
ICC East Asia-Pacific

References

External links
Japan Cricket Association Official Website 
Japan Cricket Association Official Website 
Cricinfo Japan
Growing up a lonely cricket fan in Japan

Cricket in Japan
National cricket teams
Cricket
Japan in international cricket